Isady is a rural locality (a khutor) in Vokhtozhskoye Rural Settlement, Gryazovetsky District, Vologda Oblast, Russia. The population was 52 as of 2002. There are 10 streets.

Geography 
Isady is located 58 km southeast of Gryazovets (the district's administrative centre) by road. Vokhtoga is the nearest rural locality.

References 

Rural localities in Gryazovetsky District